John Henry Heitmann (September 11, 1842 – March 26, 1894) was the 25th mayor of Columbus, Ohio and the 22nd person to serve in that office. He served Columbus for two terms. His successor, Gilbert G. Collins, took office in 1879.  He died on March 26, 1894.

References

Bibliography

Further reading

External links 
John H. Heitmann at Political Graveyard

Mayors of Columbus, Ohio
1842 births
1894 deaths
Ohio Democrats
Hanoverian emigrants to the United States
19th-century American politicians